D'Angelo "Dee" Barksdale (c.1978-79 - July 21, 2003) is a fictional character on the HBO drama The Wire, played by Larry Gilliard Jr. D'Angelo is the nephew of Avon Barksdale and a lieutenant in his drug dealing organization which controls most of the trade in West Baltimore. Stuck between the top and the bottom of the drug trade, he represents the trope of the everyman, and pathos is derived from his wider emotional range than the other gangsters, situation and fate. The immorality and ruthlessness of the drug trade gradually wears on D'Angelo's conscience, bringing him into conflict with the Barksdale leadership, most notably Stringer Bell.

Biography

Season 1
Approximately 23 years of age, D'Angelo Barksdale is a high-ranking lieutenant in the criminal organization of his uncle Avon Barksdale. His mother Brianna is also a high-ranking advisor. Prior to the series, D'Angelo controlled the high-rise tower of 221 West Fremont, a major drug market. He was confronted by dealer "Pooh" Blanchard in the lobby and, in a panic, shot him in front of civilian witnesses. 

He was quickly arrested and served 8 months in county jail before, in the series premiere, standing trial for this murder, represented by the organization's lawyer Maurice Levy. Though one witness, William Gant, willingly testifies, the organization has scared and/or bribed the other witness, Nakeesha Lyles, to recant her testimony. D'Angelo is thus acquitted. 

As punishment for his carelessness, Avon demotes D'Angelo to the low rise projects known as "The Pit", where his crew consists of Bodie Broadus, Poot, Wallace, Cass and Sterling.

Over the course of the season, D'Angelo grows increasingly ambivalent about the drug trade. D'Angelo is shaken when William Gant turns up dead, assuming Avon had it done as revenge for testifying. He is brought in for questioning by detectives Jimmy McNulty and Bunk Moreland, who trick him into writing a letter of apology to Gant's fictitious family (in actuality a photo of Bunk's family). Levy arrives and stops him before he can write anything incriminating, and he is released. He questions his uncle, who evades his accusations and persuades him to remain loyal to the family.

D'Angelo is very hesitant about discipline (such as the brutal beating of Johnny Weeks, or punishing dealers Cass and Sterling for stealing small amounts).

D'Angelo is also unwittingly involved in a second murder, that of Avon's girlfriend Deirdre Kresson. When cooperating with the police after his arrest they question him about this murder. D'Angelo claims he had delivered drugs to Kresson, serving as a distraction when Wee-Bey Brice killed her. 

Wee-Bey gladly takes the blame for this and other murders that were unsolved at the time of his arrest, since he was facing life without parole either way. Earlier in the season, D'Angelo had falsely claimed responsibility for killing Kresson himself, apparently in an attempt to impress his subordinates Bodie, Poot, and Wallace.

D'Angelo has a son, Tyrell, by his girlfriend Donette. She wants D'Angelo to move in with her, but he does not want, or is unable to handle the responsibility of being a regular citizen and family man.

D'Angelo begins dating a dancer from his uncle's strip club, Shardene Innes, and lives with her for a short time, until Shardene finds out from the police that her colleague Keesha had overdosed, died, and been left in a dumpster after attending a Barksdale crew party. She accuses D'Angelo of seeing her as trash that could easily be discarded, and moves out. She goes on to cooperate with the police unit investigating the Barksdale clan and later begins a relationship with Lester Freamon.

Under D'Angelo's firm leadership, The Pit begins to turn a good profit. It nevertheless becomes a cause for concern when its stash is stolen by Omar Little, and, the next day, the police raid. Their information is slightly outdated, and they raid a now abandoned stash house, but Lester finds D'Angelo's uncoded pager number on a wall.

Stringer chastises D'Angelo for his sloppiness, and Avon places a bounty on Omar's crew. Wallace and Poot identify Omar's boyfriend, Brandon, in an arcade. D'Angelo relays the message to Stringer, who has Brandon captured, tortured, and killed, and his corpse displayed in the courtyard of Wallace's home. Wallace becomes haunted by his role in Brandon's death. 
 
Relating to Wallace's aversion to the violence of their trade, D'Angelo develops a friendship with Wallace. When Wallace wants to leave the business after seeing Brandon's mutilated remains, D'Angelo is supportive and gives him money. 

Stringer begins asking after Wallace. D'Angelo senses that Wallace is in trouble and asks Avon to leave him alone, reassuring him that Wallace is no danger to the organization. When Wallace returns and asks for his old job back, D'Angelo tries to get him to leave, but is unable to save him. Wallace is killed on Stringer's orders, though D'Angelo remains unaware that Bodie and Poot killed him.

Based indirectly on information Shardene provided to the police (the microphone inside the club which listens to Avon), D'Angelo is arrested while running drugs from New York, and is again interrogated. McNulty tells him that Wallace is dead. D'Angelo remembers the trick from before that got him writing a letter to Gant's fictitious family and doesn't believe him at first. Stringer comes to talk to him and refuses to answer when D'Angelo demands to know where Wallace is. 

Stringer warns D'Angelo to shut his mouth which confirms in D'Angelo's mind what had happened. He grows angry and tells Stringer he doesn't want to use Levy, permanently driving a wedge in their already fractured relationship. D'Angelo is furious at Wallace's death, and briefly turns state's witness against the Organization. 

He tells them where Wee-Bey has fled to after shooting Kima Greggs, and offers numerous details of his uncle's organization. However, a visit from his mother convinces him of his duty to his family, and he reneges on the deal. Due to his refusal to cooperate, he is sentenced to a maximum of 20 years in prison.  While serving his sentence, he says the best he can hope for is 10 years before a possibility of parole.

Season 2
While in prison with Avon and Wee-Bey, D'Angelo begins using heroin. Although he is distant from his uncle, Avon still protects him and gets him a cushy job in the prison library.

Wee-Bey is being harassed by a guard named Dwight Tilghman, who is involved in the prison drug trade. Avon arranges to have Tilghman's heroin supply laced with rat poison and advises D'Angelo to stay off the drug for a few days to prove he's not an addict, but does not tell D'Angelo of the plan. At least one of the inmates D'Angelo was friendly with accepted doses of the tainted drugs. 

After five prisoners die and eight more land in the infirmary, Avon informs on Tilghman in exchange for an earlier parole board hearing and a recommendation for early release. D'Angelo refuses to take part in the plan and, disgusted by his uncle's immorality, declares that he wants nothing more to do with his family or with Stringer.

Stringer Bell grows afraid that D'Angelo may inform on the organization and hires a contract killer from Washington, D.C., who in turn arranges for a prisoner to strangle D'Angelo with a belt in the back room of the library, staging the scene to look like a suicide. No investigation is launched, although McNulty becomes convinced that it was a murder when he is belatedly informed and investigates it on his own. D'Angelo's family members continue to believe it was a suicide until McNulty confronts Donette and Brianna with his suspicions. Stringer tells Avon of his involvement in season 3.

Critical response
A San Francisco Chronicle review picked the scene of D'Angelo instructing Bodie and Wallace on the rules of chess as one of the first season's finest moments. They praised the character of D'Angelo and the show's portrayal of his difficulties as "middle management" in the drug organization: having to deal with unreliable subordinates, demanding superiors, and his own conscience.

Other
The character's name is a tribute to Donald Argee Barksdale, the first African-American player of the ABA/NBA team Baltimore Bullets.  The character's favorite beverage appears to be ginger ale, as he is seen asking for and drinking it numerous times throughout the course of season 1.

References

The Wire characters
Fictional African-American people
Fictional murdered people
Fictional career criminals
Fictional murderers
Television characters introduced in 2002
Drug dealers of The Wire
Fictional prisoners and detainees in the United States
Male characters in television